Reishauer is a Swiss machine tool builder based in Wallisellen, which manufactures gear grinding machines.
 
The company was founded in 1788 by the toolmaker Hans Jakob Däniker as a craft enterprise in Zurich. In 1870, the company was officially registered as a tool factory. In 1945, the first continuous generating gear grinding machine, ZA, was launched on the market, introducing a form of gear grinding that is today known as the Reishauer process. Soon after this, production expanded to gear parts outside machine-tool-engineering and met the requirements of the aircraft industry and the automotive industry. Reishauer AG is a subsidiary of Reishauer Beteiligungen AG, to which the German Felsomat AG has been a part of since 2010. The most important customers are the automotive industry and its suppliers.
 
Reishauer manufactures: gear grinding machines, grinding and dressing tools, clamping systems, and automation solutions. All components are supplied from one source with more than 80% vertical integration. Reishauer describes its performance system as a Circle of Competence, in which all machine components, tooling, and automation are manufactured in-house.

History

Foundation as a toolmaker (from 1788) 
The company was founded in 1788 by the toolmaker Hans Jakob Däniker as a craft enterprise in Zurich.  Däniker's son Gottfried Reishauer trained as a toolmaker in the business and took over the management in 1824. In 1870, the company was officially registered as a tool factory. In 1882, the Aktiengesellschaft für Fabrikation Reishauer'scher Werkzeuge was founded, and the portfolio was expanded to include thread gauges in addition to thread cutting tools.

The step to mechanical engineering (from 1924) 
As the thread grinding machines that were currently available on the market did not meet Reishauer's requirements, they designed their own thread grinding machine in 1924. The RK Gewinde started to work in the factory in 1928 and marked the step towards becoming a machine tool manufacturer. In 1931, the first in-house made machine for grinding taps was put into operation. Soon Reishauer began to produce the machines not only for his own needs but also to sell them to other companies. This enabled the company to bridge the declining demand for tools in the years after 1929.

The introduction of the continuous generating grinding process and the rise to become an international company (from 1945) 
In 1945, the first continuous generating gear grinding machine, ZA, was launched on the market, introducing a form of gear grinding, today known as the Reishauer process. This machine had been preceded by a 15-year development period, as Reishauer wanted to find a more accurate, faster, and cheaper method of manufacturing gears.  1968, the AZA, a new gear grinding machine, was produced. The AZA was based on the same continuous generating process but allowed one person to operate several grinders at the same time, thanks to streamlining the operating process. Reishauer thus took the first step towards automating the gear grinding process. At the same time, production at Reishauer’s customers expanded to gear parts outside machine tool engineering, andt included gears for printing machines, trucks, tractors, and pumps. The electronic generating gearbox, introduced in 1977 with the RZ300E, ensured a level of precision that met the requirements of the aircraft industry. In 1986, the RZ301S enhanced generating grinding with shift grinding, which enabled constant grinding forces and higher profile accuracy. In 1993, the RZ362A, the first high-performance gear grinding machine, made its entry into the automotive industry. With this machine, Reishauer introduces the Low Noise Shifting (LNS) process, which reduced unwanted gear noise. In 1998, the company started its own diamond tool production and laid the foundation for its performance system, the Circle of Competence.

Universal machine and technological development (from 2001) 
In 2001, the RZ400, the first universal machine, was launched on the market. It included the electronic generating gearbox developed by Reishauer with interfering signal suppression and extremely high drive rigidity. Furthermore, the RZ400 featured a Windows user interface, safety monitoring of the drive axes, and grinding at 63 m/s cutting speed and dressing of and grinding with multi-start threaded grinding wheels. With the RZ150, developed in 2003, two-spindle technology was introduced, which achieved a further increase in productivity. The machine was specially designed for automotive transmission gears. 2006 saw the launch of the RZ1000, which, just like the RZ400, was particularly adapted to job shops.

In 2008, Reishauer started the production of vitrified grinding wheels and built a new fully automated plant for this purpose in Pfaffnau, the canton of Lucerne, Switzerland. In 2009, the RZ60 series (RZ60, 160, 260) was designed, mainly for the automotive industry, but also for job shops, and further increased the productivity of the Reishauer process. In 2010, Reishauer started the development of clamping devices, which were launched in 2012. In 2014, Reishauer automation was introduced as part of the company's own performance system.

Corporate structure 
Reishauer AG is a subsidiary of Reishauer Beteiligungen AG, to which the German Felsomat AG has been part since 2010. The most important customers are the automotive industry and its suppliers.  Reishauer has branches in Germany, France, Japan, China, and the USA.

Products 
Reishauer manufactures gear grinding machines, grinding and dressing tools, clamping systems, and automation solutions.  All components are supplied from one source with more than 80% vertical integration.  Machines specifically customized for each customer.  Reishauer offers complete systems for the production of high-quality gears, including loading and unloading systems for its gear grinding machines.  Almost 100% of the products are exported.  Reishauer describes its performance system as a Circle of Competence, in which all machine components, tooling, and automation are manufactured in-house.

See also 
 List of Swiss companies 
Wikipedia entry Reishauer in German

External links 
 Official website

References 

Machine tool builders
Companies based in the canton of Zürich